Clough Rangers Athletic Football Club is a junior-level football club playing in the Ballymena & Provincial League in Northern Ireland.

See also
Football in Northern Ireland
List of football clubs in Northern Ireland

References

External links
 nifootball.co.uk - (For fixtures, results and tables of all Northern Ireland amateur football leagues)

Association football clubs in Northern Ireland
Association football clubs in County Antrim